This is a list of French football transfers for the 2016–17 winter transfer window. Only moves featuring Ligue 1 or Ligue 2 are listed.

Ligue 1

Note: Flags indicate national team as has been defined under FIFA eligibility rules. Players may hold more than one non-FIFA nationality.

Angers SCO

In:

Out:

SC Bastia

In:

Out:

FC Girondins de Bordeaux

In:

Out:

SM Caen

In:

Out:

Dijon FCO

In:

Out:

En Avant de Guingamp

In:

Out:

Lille OSC

In:

Out:

FC Lorient

In:

Out:

Olympique Lyonnais

In:

Out:

Olympique de Marseille

In:

Out:

FC Metz

In:

Out:

AS Monaco

In:

Out:

Montpellier HSC

In:

Out:

AS Nancy

In:

Out:

FC Nantes

In:

Out:

OGC Nice

In:

Out:

Paris Saint-Germain

In:

Out:

Stade Rennais F.C.

In:

Out:

AS Saint-Étienne

In:

Out:

Toulouse FC

In:

Out:

Ligue 2

AC Ajaccio

In:

Out:

Amiens SC

In:

Out:

AJ Auxerre

In:

Out:

Bourg-Péronnas

In:

Out:

Stade Brestois 29

In:

Out:

Clermont Foot

In:

Out:

Gazélec Ajaccio

In:

Out:

Stade Lavallois

In:

Out:

Le Havre AC

In:

Out:

RC Lens

In:

Out:

Nîmes Olympique

In:

Out:

Chamois Niortais F.C.

In:

Out:

US Orléans

In:

Out:

Red Star FC

In:

Out:

Stade de Reims

In:

Out:

FC Sochaux-Montbéliard

In:

Out:

RC Strasbourg

In:

Out:

Tours FC

In:

Out:

Troyes AC

In:

Out:

Valenciennes FC

In:

Out:

References

See also
 2016–17 Ligue 1
 2016–17 Ligue 2

Transfers winter
France
2016-17